Polo Urías is a Regional Mexican singer from Ojinaga, Chihuahua, Mexico. He specializes in the Norteño-Sax genre. He came to prominence when he performed with his brothers’ band, Los Jilgueros del Arroyo. He then left the group to become the primary vocalist of Los Rieleros del Norte. He left that group in 1993 to form his own band, Polo Urías y su Maquina Norteña. Some of his most popular hits are Veinte Años, Una Aventura, and Mi Primer Amor.

Early life
Urías was born in the state of Chihuahua, near the border town of Ojinaga. Urías recalls that when he was very young he would often sing while plowing in the fields with his mules, without any accordions, guitars, or musical instruments. Later, he became a railroad worker.

Musical career
His first professional work came when he joined Los Jilgueros Del Arroyo.

Although he  resides in Hobbs, New Mexico, United States, the city of Ojinaga has officially honored him for his contributions. He has also impacted the city of Odessa, Texas leading the mayor of the city, Larry Melton, to honor him with the key to the city and marking every 15 November as "Polo Urias Day". "It's a great honor," the singer says, because he knows the people of Odessa have watched him grow.

Today, his band Polo Urías y su Maquina Norteña (Polo Urías and his Engine of the North), is very popular on regional Mexican radio in various parts of both the United States and Mexico.

In 1994 the band released Rifaré mi suerte (First Polo Urias album solo)
 In 1995 the band released Sigue la Aventura (First as Polo Urias y Su Máquina Norteña)
In 1996 the band released Incontentible and El Campeon de Campeones''In 1997 the band released A todo vaporIn 1998 the band released Corridos and A que te supoIn 2000 the band released Mi Historia
In 2001 the band released De Chihuahua para tiIn 2002 the band released Sin FrenosIn 2003 the band released Para mi razaIn 2004 the band released En La CumbreIn 2005 the band released Que Barbaros and Polo Urias En VivoIn 2006 the band released Y...sigue la maquina dandoIn 2008 the band released A Paso Firme with the single "Seis Pies Abajo"
In 2009 the band released Sigo Siendo El Maestro with the single "Aunque Me Duela".
In 2011 the band released Grandes Recuerdos de Cantina with the single "La Puntada"
In 2013 the band released La Madre de todas la maquinas with the single "Soledad"
In 2014 the band released  Clasicas De Ayer Y Siempre  with the single "Por El Amor A Mi Madre"

Personal life
Polo Urías has eleven siblings, many of whom are also members of norteño-sax bands. He is the uncle of Adolfo Urías, another norteño-sax singer. His latest release Y sigue la maquina dando'' featuring the hit single "Porque Volviste" was a hit in the U.S.

In 2007, he bought a tour bus valued at over $250,000 after his original bus was burned in 2006. All members of the band were on board, and asleep at the time of the incident, but somehow managed to escape unharmed thanks to a motorist who flagged the bus driver, Jose "Joe" Luis Avila, down.

In August 2020, Urías suffered from a severe case of COVID-19 and spent several days in intensive care at an El Paso hospital.

See also
Los Rieleros del Norte

External links
Fonovisa website
Polo Urias Myspace Website  Contains All other Albums
Polo Urias Myspace Website  Contains "A Paso Firme" Album and "En Vivo 30 Anos"

References 

Mexican accordionists
Norteño musicians
People from Chihuahua (state)
Living people
People from Hobbs, New Mexico
21st-century accordionists
21st-century Mexican male singers
Year of birth missing (living people)